Tushnabad (or Tusnabad) is a rural village in Ferrargunj, South Andaman, Andaman and Nicobar Islands. It is adjacent to the Jarawa Reserve

As of the 2011 census, Tushnabad had a population of 1320 people in 286 families, of which 681 are males while 639 are females. The literacy rate was 89.68% as per the census. The village is administrated by an Elected Pradhan(As of 30 July 2021 local government elections are still to be held - Delayed because of the Coronavirus Pandemic).

This area infrastructure includes a community hall, Senior Secondary School, Primary Health Centre.

Most people in the area don't have fast Internet Connection as sufficient infrastructure is not allotted by the Government.

References
 India Census 2011
 Wikimapia entry
 They Stole Sarees, Midi, Maxis, equipments and threatened to chop our heads off: Pradhan Tushnabad, Andaman Chronicle, 17 February 2013
 Jarawa Youths Threaten to Chop Heads: Tushnabad Pradhan, Andaman Sheeka, 26 January 2012
 Stone age Jarawa tribe give tough time to Andaman villagers, OneIndia News, 1 November 2006

Cities and towns in South Andaman district
South Andaman Island